Serrano may refer to:

People
 Serrano people, a Native American tribe of Southern California
 Serrano language, the language spoken by the Serrano people
Serrano (surname), people with the surname Serrano

Places
Serrano, Lecce, an Italian town
Serrano Community in El Dorado Hills, California
Villa Serrano, Bolivia

Ships
Serrano-class destroyer, a class of Chilean warship; also the name of the lead destroyer in the class
Serrano, or Teniente Serrano, a Chilean destroyer built in 1896

Other uses
Serrano ham, a type of dry-cured Spanish ham
Serrano (restaurant), a chain of Tex-Mex restaurants in Iceland and Sweden
Serrano pepper, a type of chili
Serrano Football Club, a Brazilian football club
Serrano Futebol Clube (PE), a Brazilian football club
Serrano Sport Club, a Brazilian football club
Serrano (Madrid Metro), a station on Line 4
Los Serrano, a Spanish television drama comedy
Serrano, a series of novels by Elizabeth Moon set in the fictional Familias Regnant universe
Serrano, code name for the Samsung Galaxy S4 Mini